Huamantanga (from Quechua Waman Tanka, meaning "falcon bifurcation") is one of seven districts of the Canta Province in Peru.

Geography 
Other mountains are listed below:

References